The Indian cricket team toured Zimbabwe from 26 September to 10 October 1998 in a tour consisting of three One Day Internationals (ODI) and a one-off Test match. The ODI series was named Hero Honda series for sponsorship reasons.

This was India's third tour of Zimbabwe, after the tours of 1992–93 and 1996–97. It began with ODI games on 26 and 27 September, both of which was won by India by a margin of eight wickets. Zimbabwe won the final game by a 37-run margin played three days later, a win that their coach David Houghton attributed to Eddo Brandes. Henry Olonga who returned to Zimbabwe's Test side after two years played a significant role his team's 61-run win that followed the ODI series, and was named player of the match. Meanwhile, India's poor record in Tests away from home continued, having won only one away Test since 1986. The tour also included a three-day first-class game between the India and Zimbabwe Cricket Union President's XI.

Squads

In the Zimbabwe side that was picked for the ODI series and the one-off Test, Grant Flower was a notable exclusion. He was dropped after he sustained a finger injury in a club game on 20 September. Other team regulars who missed out included Guy Whittall, who was rested after he underwent a knee surgery, and Everton Matambanadzo, who had an injured shoulder. John Rennie and Gary Brent were added back to the squad, alongside Zimbabwe under-19 player Mluleki Nkala. India's touring party included coach Anshuman Gaekwad and administrative manager C. T. Palanka.

Eddo Brandes returned to the side after recovering from an injury for the third ODI. Henry Olonga who was not included in the initial squad, was included in the one-off Test, making his comeback in the Test side after two years, alongside Neil Johnson.

Tour match

Three-day: Zimbabwe Cricket Union President's XI v Indians

One-day Series

First ODI

Second ODI

Third ODI

Test Series

Only Test

Notes

References

External links
 Tour home at ESPNcricinfo
 

1998 in Indian cricket
1998 in Zimbabwean cricket
1998
International cricket competitions from 1997–98 to 2000
Zimbabwean cricket seasons from 1980–81 to 1999–2000